This is the discography for American rock musician Mike Keneally.

Primary studio albums

Companion titles

Covers album

Live albums

Archival compilations

Videos and DVDs

 Soap Scum Remover VHS - 1996
 Dog Special Edition DVD - 2004
 Guitar Therapy Live Special Edition DVD - 2005
 hat. Special Edition DVD - 2007
 Boil That Dust Speck Special Edition DVD - 2007
 Bakin' @ the Potato DVD - 2010
 Evidence of Humanity DVD - 2010
 Sluggo! Deluxe Edition DVD - 2013

Compilations featuring Mike Keneally

Frank Zappa recordings with Mike Keneally

 Broadway The Hard Way - 1988
 The Best Band You Never Heard In Your Life - 1991
 Make A Jazz Noise Here - 1991
 You Can't Do That on Stage Anymore, Vol. 4 - 1991
 You Can't Do That on Stage Anymore, Vol. 6 - 1992
 Trance-Fusion - 2006

Recordings with other artists

References 

Discographies of American artists
Rock music discographies